Ralf Richter may refer to:

 Ralf Richter (actor) (born 1957), German actor
 Ralf Richter (figure skater), former East German figure skater